The Minsk electoral district was a constituency created for the 1917 Russian Constituent Assembly election.

The electoral district consisted of the Minsk Governorate and the parts of the Vilna Governorate and the Kovno Governorate that were not under German occupation. Notably, the soldiers based in the garrison in Minsk voted in the Western Front electoral district rather than the Minsk electoral district.

White Russian separatism was a negligible force in the electoral district. The conservative press reported a quiet and orderly election in the province.

The most voted list in the city of Minsk was the Jewish National Electoral Committee, which obtained 12,688 votes (35.5%), followed by the Bolsheviks with 9,521 votes (26.7%), the Polish list 4,242 votes (11.9%), Menshevik-Bund 2,870 votes (8%), Kadets 2,057 votes (5.8%), Poalei-Zion 1,463 votes (4.1%), Russian Democrats 1,446 votes (4.1%), SRs 977 votes (2.7%), United Jewish Socialist Labour Party 278 votes (0.8%), Gromada 160 votes (0.4%) and Landowners 49 voters.

Results
According to U.S. historian Oliver Henry Radkey, whose account is used for the results table below, stated that his count of the result in Minsk was largely complete, only lacking 3 out of 25 volosts in Mozyrsky Uyezd. These 3 volosts had 16,755 eligible voters. Per Soviet historian L. M. Spirin, there were two lists (List no. 4 - Kalinkavichy Soviet of Peasants Deputies and List no. 7 - Unity) that were registered but did not figure in the vote count.

References

Electoral districts of the Russian Constituent Assembly election, 1917
Minsk Governorate